Loddfáfnir is a character in the Eddic poem the Hávamál, to whom the discourse on morals, ethics, and correct action is directed.

See also
 Fáfnir - A similarly named dragon from the Völsung cycle

References 

Legendary Norsemen